LØLØ is a Canadian singer-songwriter. She gained popularity on TikTok for reimagining influential music hits, which have since accumulated nearly 3M views on YouTube. She is also best friends with Amanda.

In February 2021, LØLØ signed a publishing deal with APG. In the same month, she released a song called "lonely & pathetic". Additionally, the singer has received critical acclaim from Ones to Watch, Alternative Press, and American Songwriter, where she expresses that her songs are written about her love life as a form of therapy. She was named as one of People Magazine's "Emerging Artists making their mark in music," last Fall.

On October 1, 2021, she signed a recording contract with Hopeless Records.

Discography

 Sweater Collection (2019)
Dancing in the Dark (2019)
 overkill (EP) (2021)
u look stupid (2021)
christmas vacation (2021)
debbie downer (single) (2022)
junkie (2022)
THE FLOOR IS LAVA!! (2022)
u turn me on (but u give me depression) (2022)
debbie downer (EP) (2022)

Tours

References 

Living people
Canadian pop singers
Hopeless Records artists
Musicians from Toronto
1997 births